Kahe is a group of wards in Moshi Rural District, Kilimanjaro Region, northeastern Tanzania. There are 11 towns, including Oria Village.

The population of Kahe is approximately 28,000 people. It is a low socio-economic area. There are nine primary schools.

References

Populated places in Kilimanjaro Region